Ascochyta medicaginicola (syn. Phoma medicaginis) is a plant pathogen infecting alfalfa and Medicago truncatula. One particular disease is spring black stem.

See also
List of Ascochyta species

References

External links 
 Index Fungorum
 USDA ARS Fungal Database

Fungal plant pathogens and diseases
Food plant pathogens and diseases
Pleosporales
Fungi described in 1886
Taxa named by Casimir Roumeguère